Bridget Cherry OBE, FSA, Hon. FRIBA (born 17 May 1941) is a British architectural historian who was series editor of the Pevsner Architectural Guides from 1971 until 2002, and is the author or co-author of several volumes in the series.

Family and education 
Cherry is the elder sister of the neurosurgeon Henry Marsh. She studied history at Lady Margaret Hall, Oxford University, matriculating in 1960. She went on to study History of Art at the Courtauld Institute of Art, specialising in English Romanesque architecture.

Career

Pevsner Architectural Guides 
Cherry began work on the Buildings of England series as Nikolaus Pevsner's research assistant in 1968, and from 1971 to 2002 was the series editor. She revised several volumes including Surrey, Northamptonshire, Hertfordshire, Devon and Wiltshire, and authored or co-authored four of the London volumes (South, North-West, North and East).

Other interests 
Cherry is vice-president of the Heritage of London Trust, a Council member of the London Topographical Society and a member of the board of the Ironbridge Heritage Trust. She is a life trustee of the Sir John Soane's Museum, London. Cherry previously served as a commissioner for English Heritage, the Royal Commission on Historical Monuments of England and as a trustee of Historic Royal Palaces. Following her retirement, she edits the London Topographical Society's newsletter.

Honours and awards 
Cherry was appointed a Member of the Order of the British Empire in 2003.

She is a Fellow of the Society of Antiquaries and since 1993 a Fellow of the Royal Institute of British Architects.

Publications

Books 

 Northamptonshire. (2nd ed.) revised by Bridget Cherry. With contributions from Sir Gyles Isham and Bruce Bailey, 1973, Harmondsworth: Penguin. 
 Dudmaston Shropshire: A souvenir guide / Bridget Cherry, 2018. Rotherham: National Trust. 
 The buildings of England: a short history and bibliography / Bridget Cherry, 1983, Linton: Published for the Penguin Collectors' Society by Dalby. 
 Ivy-Mantled Tower: a history of the church and churchyard of St. Mary Hornsey, Middlesex / Bridget Cherry, 2015, London: Hornsey Historical Society. 
 London. 2, South / Bridget Cherry and Nikolaus Pevsner 1994–2001, Harmondsworth: Penguin, 
 London. 4, North / Bridget Cherry & Nikolaus Pevsner, 2002, New Haven, Conn.; London: Yale University Press. 
 London. 3, North West / Bridget Cherry and Nikolaus Pevsner, 2002, New Haven, Conn.; London: Yale University Press. 
 The Buildings of England, Ireland, Scotland and Wales: a short history and bibliography / Bridget Cherry, 1998, [Great Britain]: Penguin Collectors' Society. 
 London. 5, East / Bridget Cherry, Charles O'Brien and Nikolaus Pevsner; with contributions from Elizabeth Williamson, Malcolm Tucker and Pamela Greenwood. 2005, New Haven, Conn.; London: Yale University Press. 
 Dissent and the gothic revival: papers from a study day at Union Chapel Islington / edited by Bridget Cherry. 2007, London: The Chapels Society. 
 Hornsey Town Hall / Bridget Cherry, 1995, London: Hornsey Historical Society
 Civic pride in Hornsey: the Town Hall and its surrounding buildings / Bridget Cherry. c.2006, London: Hornsey Historical Society. 
 Crouch End: a walk / Bridget Cherry and Ken Gay; illustrated by Peter Garland. 1995, London: Hornsey Historical Society.

Articles 

 Bridget Cherry and Ken Gay, Crouch End, A Walk. (1995). The London Journal: A Review of Metropolitan Society past and Present, 20(2), 126. Journal 
 Cherry, Bridget. (2019). BOOK REVIEW: THE ANTIQUARIES JOURNAL. The Antiquaries Journal, 99, 465. Journal ;
 Cherry, Bridget, Rawcliffe, Carole, Shoemaker, Robert B., & Darby, Nell. (2014). Survey of London, Volume 49, Battersea, Part I: Public Commercial and Cultural. The London Journal, 39, 168–174. Journal ;
 Cherry, Bridget, "London's Public Events and Ceremonies: an Overview Through Three Centuries". Architectural History, vol. 56, 2013, pp. 1–28. JSTOR
 Cherry, Bridget, and Nikolaus Pevsner. "The Modern Movement in Britain". Twentieth Century Architecture, no. 8, 2007, pp. 12–38. JSTOR, 
 Cherry, Bridget. "Edward Hatton's New View of London". Architectural History, vol. 44, 2001, pp. 96–105. JSTOR,
 Cherry, Bridget. "An Early Sixteenth-Century London Tomb Design". Architectural History, vol. 27, 1984, pp. 86–95. JSTOR,

As contributor 

 The buildings of England: further reading: a select bibliography / compiled by Tye Blackshaw, Bridget Cherry, Elisabeth Williamson.
 Northamptonshire / Bruce Bailey, Nikolaus Pevsner and Bridget Cherry. 2013, New Haven: Yale University Press. 
 The best buildings of England / Nikolaus Pevsner; an anthology by Bridget Cherry and John Newman; with an introduction by John Newman, 1986, [Harmondsworth]: Viking. 
 The buildings of England: a celebration / edited by Simon Bradley and Bridget Cherry, 2001. Beccles: The Penguin Collectors' Society for the Buildings Books Trust. 
 Bristol / Andrew Foyle; with contributions by Bridget Cherry, 2004, New Haven, Conn.; London: Yale University Press. 
 Hertfordshire / James Bettley, Nikolaus Pevsner and Bridget Cherry; with contributions from Stewart Bryant, Lee Prosser and Alec Clifton-Taylor, 2019, New Haven: Yale University Press.

Photography 
Photographs contributed by Cherry to the Conway Library are currently (2020) being digitised by the Courtauld Institute of Art, as part of the Courtauld Connects project.

References

1941 births
Living people
British architectural historians
British women historians
Alumni of Lady Margaret Hall, Oxford
Alumni of the Courtauld Institute of Art
Fellows of the Society of Antiquaries of London
Officers of the Order of the British Empire
Fellows of the Royal Institute of British Architects